Kőszeg is a town in Vas county, Hungary.

Kőszeg may also refer to:

 Kőszeg Mountains
 Kőszegi, a Hungarian surname

See also
 Sacred Heart Church (Kőszeg, Hungary)
 Siege of Kőszeg